Latalia Bevan (born 26 January 2001) is a Welsh artistic gymnast.

Bevan participated in the 2015 Northern European Gymnastics Championships winning gold medals in the individual all-round, team all-round, balance and floor events.

In 2018, she won a silver medal for Wales at the Commonwealth Games in the Women's floor event.

References

2001 births
Living people
Welsh female artistic gymnasts
Gymnasts at the 2018 Commonwealth Games
Commonwealth Games medallists in gymnastics
Commonwealth Games silver medallists for Wales
Gymnasts at the 2015 European Games
Sportspeople from Merthyr Tydfil
Medallists at the 2018 Commonwealth Games